Puerto Rico Highway 568 (PR-568) is a road that travels from Orocovis to Corozal, Puerto Rico. It begins at its intersection with PR-5155 in downtown Orocovis and ends at PR-159 in western Corozal.

Major intersections

Related route

Puerto Rico Highway 5568 (PR-5568) is a spur route located in Padilla barrio. It begins at PR-568 and ends at its junction with PR-159 and PR-647 near Unibón and Cienegueta barrios.

See also

 List of highways numbered 568

References

External links

Historia de las carreteras de Puerto Rico 

568